Hebden Bridge signal box is a Grade II listed former Lancashire and Yorkshire Railway signal box, located close to Hebden Bridge railway station in West Yorkshire, England.

Built in 1891, it is one of only a few remaining L&YR signal boxes to survive in anything like original condition.

In July 2013, it was one of 26 "highly distinctive" signal boxes listed by Ed Davey, minister for the Department for Culture, Media and Sport, in a joint initiative by English Heritage and Network Rail to preserve and provide a window into how railways were operated in the past.

References

Lancashire and Yorkshire Railway
Rail transport in West Yorkshire
Grade II listed buildings in West Yorkshire
Signal boxes in the United Kingdom
Hebden Bridge